Cryptolechia asemanta is a moth in the family Depressariidae. It was described by Paul Dognin in 1905. It is found in Ecuador (Loja Province).

References

Moths described in 1905
Cryptolechia (moth)
Taxa named by Edward Meyrick